Breda Smolnikar (born 19 January 1941), is a Slovene writer who has also published under the pseudonym  Gospa. She writes for adults and young readers.

Smolnikar was born in Herceg Novi in 1941. After the outbreak of the Second World War the family moved to Slovenia. She studied textile engineering and worked in the textile industry for a number of years. She started writing young and got her first book Otročki življenje teče dalje (Children, Life Goes On) published in 1963 and won the Levstik Award for it that same year. In the 1980s she wrote adult fiction under the pseudonym Gospa. In 1998 she published her book Ko se tam gori olistajo breze (When the Birches Up There Are Greening) which brought a prolonged lawsuit upon the author and a prohibition on the sale of the book until the case was finally dismissed by the Slovenian Constitutional Court in 2005.

Published works 
 Otročki, življenje teče dalje (Children, Life Goes On), 1963
 Mali mozaik imen (The Small Mosaic of Names), 1967
 Popki (Belly Buttons), 1973
 Balada o divjem mleku (The Balad of Wild Milk), 1980
 Ko je umiral Stob (When Stob Was Dying), 1982
 Mrtvi Stob (Dead Stob), 1982
 Stobovske balade (Stob's Balads), 1985
 Ko se tam gori olistajo breze (When the Birches Up There Are Greening), 1998
 Stobovske elegije (Strob's Eulogies), 2002
 Spuščena zanka (The Loose Knot), 2003
 Ko se tam gori ne olistajo breze, (When the Birches Up There Are Not Greening), 2004 (Censored edition) 
 Poletje v zgodbi V. (The Summer in A Story V.), 2006
 Škila, 2006
 Veliki slovenski tekst (The Great Slovene Text), 2010

References

1941 births
Living people
Slovenian women writers
Slovenian children's writers
Levstik Award laureates
Slovenian women children's writers
People from Herceg Novi